Tizer is a red-coloured, citrus-flavoured soft drink bottled in Cumbernauld and sold in the United Kingdom. The name originally comes from the phrase "Tizer the Appetizer". It was launched in 1924 by Fred and Tom Pickup of Pudsey when it was known as "Pickup's Appetizer", and is the offspring of Vimto and Irn-Bru. After the death of the Pickup brothers it was owned by the Armour Trust before being sold to the Scottish drinks company A.G. Barr plc for £2.5 million in 1972. As is the case with Barr's other famous drink Irn-Bru, Tizer's exact recipe has not been made public, although a list of ingredients and nutritional data is given on the product's packaging. In 2003, Tizer decided to sell other-flavoured versions of Tizer, such as "Purple" and "Green" versions. There was also a brief "fruitz" variation of Tizer in 2004. From 1996 to 2007, Tizer was stylised as T!zer.

In 2007, the company stopped using the "Ed the Head" mascot. Tizer was re-branded with the slogan "Original Great Taste" and a classic recipe with fewer additives and no E numbers. It was also given classic 1976 style packaging. However, despite the relaunch's focus of the addition of real fruit juice and the absence of artificial flavourings, colourings and sweeteners, in 2009 the recipe was returned to the original to remove the real fruit juice and reintroduce natural flavourings, natural colours and sweeteners (Acesulfame-K). Tizer was rebranded in 2011 with a new logo and the slogan "The Great British Pop".

Tizer Ice 
Tizer Ice was launched in the late 1990s.  The drink included menthol, giving it the sensation of tasting cold, even at room temperature. Later branded "Ice by Tizer", the product did not sell well and was removed from sale. Whilst known as Tizer Ice, the mascot of the drink was a variation of Ed the Tizer Head. Its sole video advertisement which was shown in cinemas featured a character known as the "Iceman".

A 1999 print advertisement which showed children with their faces pressed against a glass surface with the slogan "How many kids can you get in your fridge?" was criticised as "inappropriate" by the Royal Society for the Prevention of Accidents, which had recorded deaths of children trapped inside refrigerators.

Tizer Diet 
Tizer Diet was a short-lived low-calorie alternative to Tizer, originally sold in the late 1980s when known as Sugar Free Tizer, and again from 1997 to 2001 as Tizer Diet. Its 2001 advertising campaign included a bus shelter advertisement in the form of a funhouse mirror bearing the Tizer Diet logo, designed to make the viewer appear thinner.

Advertising 
Tizer has been advertised under various slogans. One 1982 television advertisement for the drink featured dwarf actor David Rappaport wearing star-shaped sunglasses at a disco, the advert finishing with the slogan "You can tell it's Tizer when your eyes are shut".

A campaign in the early 1990s featured a character filmed in black and white against a bubbly red backdrop, who would say something like "stuff the donkey sanctuary, stuff donkeys'. At the end, word fragments appeared, such as "appe", "adver", "depu", "bap", "legitima", "dogma" and "chaz", all words which could be completed with "tizer" as a suffix.

In 1996, Tizer was rebranded, and the cans and bottles were redesigned to feature a new logo and a mascot, known as "Tizer Head" and later "Ed the Head". Ed appeared as a red-coloured human head, the top of which was opened so that Tizer could be poured in. Ed was played by actor Roger Moore's son.

In 1997, Tizer sponsored the rave event Rezerection/Rez, on the basis that the reverse of the name is "Rez It" ("Tizer" backwards). It was the main soft drink available at the events.

In 1997, Tizer took over the sponsorship of The Chart Show which was a Saturday morning music chart show on the ITV network in the UK.

From January 23rd 1999, Tizer was the sponsor of the newly rebranded CD:UK which had been a replacement for The Chart Show back in 1998.

As part of a rebranding process in 2003, the cans were changed to red and Ed the Head's expression was changed to a smile. The ads featured a chef battling a lobster, a troop of gorillas and monkeys drawn in the style of the Gorillaz artwork. In 2004, Tizer aired a campaign depicting a red chameleon remaining the same colour despite a number of different coloured backgrounds—the campaign's slogan was "No, we're not changing colour."

Tizer are known for their distribution of drink fridges, both full-sized ones for restaurants, shops and cafés, and smaller "mini-fridges" for public sale. Their full-sized, illuminated drink fridges from 1997 to 2003 were blue, whilst 2003–2007 fridges were red. They also distribute mobile can coolers, normally for usage in shops, and vending machines.

Tizer was also sold at the discontinued pizza restaurant chain, Pizzaland. In 1995, cans of Tizer offered that the specific can was "worth £1 at Pizzaland" when £4 or more was spent. That same year, Tizer were responsible for the "£150,000 worth of hi-tech prizes" competition, one of the biggest soft drink competitions at the time.

A successful campaign for Tizer from 2001 saw the brand package four bottles of the drink in blue lunchboxes. This was inspired by the Tango lunchbox in 2000.

Tizer sponsored a roller coaster in Southport called the "Traumatizer". The ride was closed with the park in 2006 and relocated to Blackpool Pleasure Beach, where it became known as "Infusion".

Slogans 
"You Can Tell It's Tizer When Your Eyes Are Shut" (1980, 1982)
"I'se Got The Ize" (1986)
"Refresh Your Head" (1996–2003)
"!tz a Red Thing" (2003–2007)
"Live the Red Life" (2004, for Ringtones site)
"Freeze Your Head" (1998, for Tizer Ice)
 "Don't Just Taste It. Feel It" (1999, for Ice from Tizer)
 "The Great British Pop" (2011–present)

For the slogans "Refresh Your Head" and "Freeze Your Head", the "R" in "Your", and the "E" and "D" in "Head", are highlighted so they spell out the word "Red".

Music 

The 1974 song "Back in Judy's Jungle" by Brian Eno mentions the soft drink, as does the 1983 song "Party, Party" by Elvis Costello and the 1991 song "King Leer" by Morrissey. The drink is also mentioned in the lyrics of the 1996 song "Sing Something Simple" by the neo-progressive rock act named Grace. Deacon Blue mentions the drink in the chorus of the title track on their 1991 release Fellow Hoodlums.

Variants 
Tizer (1924–present)
Tizer Lemon (1995–1996)
Tizer Ice (1998–1999)
Ice by Tizer (1999) (same as Tizer Ice, replacement)
Diet Tizer (2001)
Tizer Forest Fruits (2004)
Tizer Orange (2004)
Tizer Citrus (2004)
Fruitz by Tizer (2004)

References

External links 
Tizer website

1924 establishments in England
British soft drink brands
Carbonated drinks
History of Manchester
Products introduced in 1924